The 2010–11 Maltese Premier League is the 96th season of the Maltese Premier League, the top-tier football league in Malta. It began in August 2010 and  ended in May 2011. Birkirkara are the defending champions, having won their third title last season.

The Premier League consists of two rounds. In the First Round, every team plays each opponent twice, once "home" and once "away" (in actuality, the designation of home and away is purely arbitrary as most of the clubs do not have their own grounds), for a total of 18 games. The league then splits into two pools. Earned points are subsequently halved. Teams that finish in positions 1–6 compete in the "Top Six" and teams that finish in positions 7–10 play in the "Play-Out".

On 13 January 2011, the Malta Football Association decided to expand the league to 12 teams as from the 2011–12 season. Therefore changes had to be made to accommodate the new number of teams. Thus only one team would be relegated at the end of this season.

Teams
Dingli Swallows and Msida St. Joseph were relegated to the First Division after finishing in the last two places of the Play-Out.

Promoted from the First Division were Marsaxlokk as champions and Vittoriosa Stars as runners-up. Both of these clubs were supposed to take part in last season's competition, but each of them were found guilty in a corruption scandal and were immediately relegated to the First Division.

Venues

Stadia and training grounds
Only a few stadia have the infrastructure needed to host Premier League matches. These are Ta' Qali National Stadium and Centenary Stadium at Ta' Qali, Victor Tedesco Stadium at Ħamrun and Hibernians Ground at Paola. Additional to that, each team has been assigned to a dedicated training ground. On a few occasions, Hibernians and Hamrun Spartans play at their home ground, but otherwise all games are played on neutral ground, rendering "home" and "away" games purely symbolic.

First phase

League table

Results

Second phase

Top Six

Play-Out

Top goalscorers

References

External links
 Premier League official page
 UEFA website

Maltese Premier League seasons
Malta
1